The Elbe Lateral Canal, is a  long canal in Lower Saxony, Germany. It runs from the Mittelland Canal near Gifhorn to the Elbe in Artlenburg. It forms an important transport connection between southern and northern Germany, and it provides a bypass of a section of the Elbe with limited navigability. At the construction start it was also thought as a bypass outside the GDR, considered politically unreliable.

Construction of the Elbe Lateral Canal was started in 1968, and the canal was opened in June 1976. Due to a dam rupture, it was closed from July 1976 until June 1977. There are small ports along the canal in Lüneburg, Uelzen and Wittingen, and a landing stage at Wulfstorf (near Bienenbüttel).

Cities and villages on Elbe Lateral Canal 
From south to north:
 Samtgemeinde Isenbüttel
 Samtgemeinde Boldecker Land
 Sassenburg
 Samtgemeinde Hankensbüttel
 Schönewörde
 Wittingen
 Samtgemeinde Aue
 Uelzen
 Bad Bevensen
 Bienenbüttel
 Wendisch Evern
 Lüneburg
 Scharnebeck
 Adendorf
 Artlenburg

References
Wasser- und Schifffahrtsamt Uelzen 

Canals in Lower Saxony
Federal waterways in Germany
Canals opened in 1976
CElbeLateral